Eight ships of the Royal Navy have been named HMS Firm or Firme.

 The French ship, La Ferme captured in 1702, was renamed HMS Firm for the Royal Navy and given to Russia in 1713.
 , a 60-gun fourth-rate ship of the line, launched on 15 January 1759. She served as a prison hulk at Portsmouth from 1784, until broken up in 1791.
 , a 16-gun floating battery, primarily based at Sheerness, launched in 1794 and disposed of in 1803.
 , a 12-gun Archer-class gun-brig, launched in 1804, and wrecked off the coast of France on 28 June 1811.
 , formerly the 74-gun  captured at the battle of Cape Finisterre (1805), which served as a prison hulk at Plymouth until sold in 1814.
 , a mortar vessel, launched on 1 March 1855, renamed Mortar Vessel 11 later that year, and disposed of in 1858.
 , a gunboat in service until sold in 1871
 , a Forester-class 2nd class gunboat, launched in 1879, and stationed at Queensferry up to 1890.

Citations

References
 Lavery, Brian (2003) The Ship of the Line - Volume 1: The development of the battlefleet 1650-1850. Conway Maritime Press. .
 

Royal Navy ship names